The Green Orchard is a 1916 British silent drama film directed by Harold Weston and starring Gregory Scott, Dora Barton and Ernie Collins. It is based on a novel by Andrew Soutar.

Cast
 Gregory Scott as Martin Wilderspin 
 Dora Barton as Fauvette Hyne  
 E. Vassal-Vaughn as Tony Rye 
 Ernie Collins

See also
His Parisian Wife (1919)

References

Bibliography
 Low, Rachael. History of the British Film, 1914-1918. Routledge, 2005.

External links

1916 films
1916 drama films
British silent feature films
British drama films
Films set in England
Films directed by Harold Weston
Films based on British novels
British black-and-white films
1910s English-language films
1910s British films
Silent drama films